Isidore Silas (born 17 March 1951) is a Cameroonian judoka. He competed in the men's heavyweight event at the 1984 Summer Olympics.

References

1951 births
Living people
Cameroonian male judoka
Olympic judoka of Cameroon
Judoka at the 1984 Summer Olympics
Place of birth missing (living people)
African Games medalists in judo
Competitors at the 1978 All-Africa Games
African Games silver medalists for Cameroon
African Games bronze medalists for Cameroon
20th-century Cameroonian people
21st-century Cameroonian people